Eurythecta eremana is a species of moth of the family Tortricidae. It was first described by Edward Meyrick in 1884. is found in New Zealand. The habitat consists of swampy areas.

The wingspan is 12–14 mm. The forewings are uniform brownish ochreous. The hindwings are dark grey. Adults have been recorded on wing in December and January.

References

Moths described in 1885
Archipini
Moths of New Zealand